Tylihul may refer to:
 Tylihul Estuary, a water body in southern Ukraine
 Tylihul (river), a river in southern Ukraine
 CS Tiligul-Tiras Tiraspol, defunct football club in the Republic of Moldova